The Barrett family played an important role in the history of Jamaica. Hercie Barrett and family members migrated from England, landing on the island of Jamaica in 1655. In the years that followed, family members acquired substantial wealth and influence. They controlled much of the island's mining and agriculture, becoming one of the most prominent plantation owners of Jamaica.

The first Barrett families in Jamaica 
The first recorded land patent in the Barrett name was recorded in 1663 in Spanish Town, granted by King Charles II to Hercie Barrett for services to his Majesty.

Hercie Barrett was an officer under Admiral William Penn and General Robert Venables who led the failed invasion of Hispaniola. They then turned their sights on Jamaica, which was much less fortified, and successfully wrested it from Spanish control for the King of England.

The first Barretts became an extremely wealthy and influential English family in Jamaica, owning more than 84,000 acres of land and 2,000 slaves in the parishes of Trelawny and St James. The original family home was Cinnamon Hill Great House in St James. The construction was started by Samuel Barrett but he died before its completion. It was completed by his son Edward, and it is Edward's generation of Barretts and their children that became among Jamaica's wealthiest and most influential planters and politicians. Elizabeth Barrett Browning was the daughter of Edward Moulton Barrett.

The Greenwood Great House was also a Barrett family home, built by Richard Barrett, the Speaker of the Assembly. It was one of several great houses owned by the Barrett family, including Cinnamon Hill located nearby and Barrett Hall, which no longer exists. Cinnamon Hill was bought by Johnny Cash, the country-and-western singer, whose home it was until his death. The Greenwood Great House still stands today. It was spared from torching during the slave rebellions, primarily because of the way Richard Barrett treated his slaves. Richard was chosen to represent the Jamaica legislature before parliament on the issues of emancipation. Despite being an owner of slaves, it appears at heart, he was an abolitionist.

See also
 Aston Barrett – musician
 Carlton Barrett – musician
 Elizabeth Barrett – poet
 Lindsay Barrett – writer
 Sarah Barrett Moulton: "Pinkie"

Further reading
 R. A. Barrett, The Barretts of Jamaica: The Family of Elizabeth Barrett Browning, Continuum International Publishing Group - Athlone, 2000,

References

Jamaican families